Rogersville is a town in Lauderdale County, Alabama, United States.  As of the 2018 census, the population of the town is 1,231, up from 1,199 in 2000.

History
The town became an incorporated municipality on February 2, 1858. Originally known as "Rodgersville", it took its name from Andrew and Patience Rodgers of South Carolina who moved into the area and purchased  at a public land sale in Huntsville on May 3, 1818. Their land eventually became what is now the downtown business district.  When the Rogersville Post Office was established on October 4, 1825, with Thomas Cunningham as the postmaster, the 'd' was dropped from the town's name and it has been known as Rogersville ever since.

The town became a popular trading center due in part to its location near the intersection of three early thoroughfares, U.S. 72, Snake Road and Lamb's Ferry Road. U.S. 72, which now connects Chattanooga and Memphis, Tennessee, was once part of an Indian trail from Ditto's Landing on the Tennessee River south of Huntsville and was used to bypass the Muscle Shoals river barrier.  Snake Road leads out of Rogersville into neighboring Limestone County and provided passage from Florence to Athens by way of a shallow ford across Elk River.  Lamb's Ferry Road was named for John Lamb who moved from Indian Creek in Giles County, Tennessee in 1816 to establish a ferry across the Tennessee River south of what would later become Rogersville. Lamb's Ferry became an important river port where boats from Knoxville and other points on the upper Tennessee River would unload supplies that were taken over land to areas around Pulaski, TN.

Geography
Rogersville is located at  (34.823444, -87.285693).

Demographics

2000 census
At the 2000 census there were 1,199 people, 536 households, and 361 families in the town. The racial makeup of the town was 93.08% White, 5.67% Black or African American, 0.17% Native American, 0.42% Asian, 0.08% from other races, and 0.58% from two or more races.  0.42% of the population were Hispanic or Latino of any race.
Of the 536 households 26.1% had children under the age of 18 living with them, 51.1% were married couples living together, 12.9% had a female householder with no husband present, and 32.5% were non-families. 31.2% of households were one person and 19.0% were one person aged 65 or older.  The average household size was 2.24 and the average family size was 2.79.

The age distribution was 22.2% under the age of 18, 7.3% from 18 to 24, 24.7% from 25 to 44, 24.4% from 45 to 64, and 21.4% 65 or older.  The median age was 42 years. For every 100 females, there were 83.6 males.  For every 100 females age 18 and over, there were 79.8 males.

The median household income was $29,779 and the median family income  was $37,639. Males had a median income of $30,852 versus $18,571 for females. The per capita income for the town was $16,435.  About 10.2% of families and 14.3% of the population were below the poverty line, including 19.2% of those under age 18 and 15.7% of those age 65 or over.

2010 census
At the 2010 census there were 1,257 people, 555 households, and 342 families in the town. The racial makeup of the town was 91.2% White, 6.1% Black or African American, 1.0% Native American, 0.6% Asian, 0.2% from other races, and 0.8% from two or more races. 1.7% of the population were Hispanic or Latino of any race.
Of the 555 households 24.7% had children under the age of 18 living with them, 44.3% were married couples living together, 13.2% had a female householder with no husband present, and 38.4% were non-families. 34.6% of households were one person and 18.9% were one person aged 65 or older.  The average household size was 2.26 and the average family size was 2.94.

The age distribution was 22.1% under the age of 18, 7.5% from 18 to 24, 23.4% from 25 to 44, 25.1% from 45 to 64, and 22.0% 65 or older. The median age was 43 years. For every 100 females, there were 87.9 males. For every 100 females age 18 and over, there were 92.6 males.

The median household income was $32,727 and the median family income  was $44,803. Males had a median income of $44,219 versus $38,229 for females. The per capita income for the town was $19,605. About 12.2% of families and 12.8% of the population were below the poverty line, including 12.5% of those under age 18 and 10.8% of those age 65 or over.

2020 census

As of the 2020 United States census, there were 1,286 people, 603 households, and 356 families residing in the town.

Notable people
Susan Parker, 37th Alabama State Auditor
Larry Woods, former NFL player
Robert Woods, former NFL offensive tackle

References

External links
Virtual Tour of Rogersville
Rogersville Public Library
Joe Wheeler State Park

Towns in Lauderdale County, Alabama
Florence–Muscle Shoals metropolitan area
Towns in Alabama
Alabama populated places on the Tennessee River